The initialism ECRL may refer to:
East Coast Rail Link, under construction in Malaysia
Epping to Chatswood railway line, which operates in Sydney, Australia
Extensor carpi radialis longus, a wrist muscle